Sutiakathi is an Union of Nesarabad (Swarupkati) Upazila, Pirojpur District in the Division of Barisal, Bangladesh.

References

Unions of Nesarabad (Swarupkati) Upazila